Full Intention is an English house music duo consisting of Michael Gray and Jon Pearn. They are best known as prolific producers and remixers. They have reworked songs for varied artists such as the Sugababes, Whitney Houston, Mariah Carey and Frankie Knuckles, among others.

Biography 
As the group Hustlers Convention, Jon Pearn and Michael Gray produced their own house tracks and remixed many others, including "Street life" by C. J. Lewis and "Got Myself Together" by the Bucket Heads. Their first release was The Groovers delight EP in 1992 on Stress Records.

They have appeared in the US Hot Dance Music/Club Play chart three times with their own singles, first under the name Arizona feat. Zeitia with "Slide on the Rhythm", which reached number one in 1993, and with "America (I Love America)" under the Full Intention name, a number one hit from 1996.  They are also perhaps most well known for their remix of the 1995 club classic "So In Love" by Duke. 

In 1997, they released a song as the act Sex-O-Sonique called "I thought it was you", which went to number one in the 1997 UK dance singles chart on 6th December, pushing The Prodigy "Smack my bitch up" off the top spot. 

Although many of their remixes for other artists have been successful club hits, they did not return to the chart as artists until 2002, when "I'll Be Waiting" featuring Shena reached number three. Both members have achieved solo success with Gray releasing singles "The Weekend" and "Borderline" which were club hits, while Pearn has formed a side project Bodyrox.

In 2009, Jon Pearn and Michael Gray released the singles "Once In A Lifetime", "I Will Follow", "Forever" under the label Full Intention Records. In 2010, they released a single entitled "America 2010", remixing their own famous 1996's song. In the late 2010s, the most popular singles of Full Intention were "Keep Pushing" (2016) and "I Miss You" (2017). In 2018, they released a single with Blaze called "Be Yourself".

Full Intention has also released a number of remixes. They released in 2018 a remix of a David Penn song with Lisa Millett entitled "Join Us". They have notably released remixes of classic house tracks like Inner City "Big Fun", Frankie Knuckles "Tears", or Black Riot "A Day In The Life".

Discography

Albums
2006 Connected: 10 Years of Full Intention
2013 Perspective Mini LP

Mixed compilations
2002 Ministry of Sound - Defected Sessions

Singles and EPs
1994: Full Length Disco Mixes
1995: Full Length Disco Mixes 2
1996 "America (I Love America)" (with Nick Clow)
1996 "The Return of Full Intention"
1996 "Uptown Downtown" (with Nick Clow)
1996 "You Are Somebody" (with Nick Clow)
1997 "America (I Love America) '97" (with Nick Clow)
1997 "Shake Your Body (Down to the Ground)" (with Nick Clow)
1997 "Dancin' All Night/In the Streets"
1998 "Everybody Loves the Sunshine" (with Ernestine Pearce and Xavier Barnett)
2001 "Can't Get Over You" (with Kat Blu)
2001 "I'm Satisfied"
2001 "I'll Be Waiting" (with Shena McSween)
2002 "Soul Power" (with Thea Austin)
2002 Blue EP
2002 "I Need a House Party"
2003 "No One"
2003 "Your Day Is Coming" (with Shena McSween)
2003 Red EP
2003 Green EP
2004 Orange EP
2004 "It's Set to Groove"
2004 "It Hurts Me/Once in a Lifetime" (with Xavier Barnett)
2004 Purple EP
2005 "La Musique"
2005 Anniversary EP
2006 "Your Day Is Coming 2006" (with Shena McSween)
2006 "I Believe in You" (with Lee Muddy Baker)
2006 "Soul Power 2006" (with Thea Austin)
2009 "Once in a Lifetime"
2009 "I Will Follow"
2010 "Forever"
2010 "America
2010 Earth Turns Around EP
2011 "Play"
2011 "I'll Be Waiting"
2011 "Signification" (with Haze)
2012 "Jupiter One"
2012 "La Musique
2013 "Octavia"
2013 "Icon"
2013 "Madness"
2013 "Sacrifice"
2013 "Float On"
2013 "Perspective"
2013 "First Time Ever"
2013 "All Right" (feat. Chelonis R. Jones)
2013 "See Basan"
2013 "Get the Money Right"
2013 "I'll Be"
2014 "Everlasting"
2014 "Feel"
2014 "London"
2014 "Do You Feel"
2014 "Let Me Be" (feat. Robert Owens)
2014 "Nobody Knows"
2014 "Meteor Man"
2014 "Walk Away"
2014 "Upside Down"
2014 "I Will Wait for You"
2015 "Mentum"
2015 "So Confused" (feat. Mira J)
2015 "Automatic"
2015 "Cova Santa"
2015 "What's in It"
2015 "Like That"
2015 "Who's Getting Down"
2015 "Don't Care What You Do"
2016 "Just Go Back" (feat. Chelsea Como)
2016 "Keep Pushing"
2016 "Dancin'" (2016 re-edit)
2017 "I Miss You" (Full Intention Remix)
2017 "It's Set to Groove"
2017 "I'll Be Waiting" (feat. Shena)
2018 "Be Yourself" (feat. Blaze)

Selected remixes
1996 Duke - "So In Love With You"
1997 Ultra Nate - "Free"
1997 Black Connection - "Give Me Rhythm"
1998 The Fog - "Been a Long Time"
1998 Eddie Amador - "House Music"
1999 Masters at Work - "To Be in Love (with India)"
1999 Frankie Knuckles - "Tears"
1999 Powerhouse - "What You Need"
1999 Da Mob feat. Jocelyn Brown - "It's All Good"
2000 Jennifer Lopez - "Love Don't Cost a Thing"
2000 AWA Band - "Timba"
2000 Moony - "Dove (I'll Be Loving You)"
2001 Shannon - "Let the Music Play"
2001 Faithless - "Muhammad Ali"
2001 Brandy - "Full Moon"
2001 Jamiroquai - "You Give Me Something"
2001 Dina Vass - "The Love I Have For You"
2002 Milky - "Just the Way You Are"
2002 Mariah Carey - "Through the Rain"
2002 Jamiroquai - "Cosmic Girl"
2002 Deepest Blue - "Shooting Star"
2002 Whitney Houston - "Whatchulookinat"
2002 Una Mas - "I Will Follow"
2003 Junior Jack - "E Samba"
2003 Sugababes - "Hole in the Head"
2003 Lemar - "Dance (With U)"
2003 Christina Milian - "Dip It Low"
2003 Sophie Ellis-Bextor - "I Won't Change You"
2003 Mylène Farmer - "L'âme-stram-gram"
2003 Emma Bunton - "Free Me"
2004 George Michael - "Amazing"
2004 Duran Duran - "Sunrise"
2005 Bob Sinclar feat. Gary Pine - "Love Generation"
2005 Bon Garcon - "Freek U"
2005 Supafly vs. Fishbowl - "Let's Get Down"
2005 Freemasons feat. Amanda Wilson - "Love On My Mind"
2005 Roachford - "River of Love"
2005 Jennifer Lopez - "Get Right"
2009 Supafly Inc - "Catch Me When I'm Falling"
2010 Hurts - "Stay"
2011 Gravitonas - "Religious"
2012 Paloma Faith - "Just Be"
2012 Supafly Feat. Shahin Badar - "Happiness"
2013 The Shapeshifters - "Incredible"
2013 Inner City - "Big Fun"
2014 Ella Henderson - "Glow"
2014 Peppermint Heaven - "Plenty of Time"
2014 Purple Disco Machine - "Need Someone"
2014 DJ Anna Feat Beverley Ely - "Secret"
2015 L. A. Funk Corporation - "Vertigo (Let's Get Down Tonight)"
2015 Michael Canitrot - "Chain Reaction"
2016 Black Riot - "A Day in the Life"
2016 Malachi feat. Moji - "How It Feels"
2017 Alaia & Gallo feat. Kevin Haden - "Go"
2017 J. Majik featuring Kathy Brown - "Love Is Not a Game"
2017 Ralphi Rosario feat. Linda Clifford - "Wanna Give It Up"
2017 Jimmy Read- "Diamond in the Back"
2018 84Bit - "Dreams"
2018 Slam Dunk'd (feat. Chromeo & Al-P) - "No Price" 
2018 David Penn ft Lisa Millett - "Join Us"
2018 Joe T. Vannelli Project - "Sweetest Day of May"
2019 Debbie Jacobs - "Don't You Want My Love"
2019 Rockers Revenge feat. Donnie Calvin - "Walking on Sunshine"
2019 Rockers Revenge - "What About the People" 
2019 Roisto & PowerDress - "All Yours"
2019 Funkatomic - "It's a House Thing"
2020 Aki Bergen feat. Carmen Sherry – "Into My Soul"
2020 Pet Shop Boys feat. Years & Years - "Dreamland"
2020 Alina K. - "Walking Your Path"
2020 Ron Carroll & Alex Kosoglaz - "Don't You Worry"
2020 Birdee, Nick Reach Up, Barbara Tucker - "Free Yourself"

See also
List of number-one dance hits (United States)
List of artists who reached number one on the US Dance chart

References

Remixers
English house music duos
Male musical duos
DJs from London
DJ duos
Electronic dance music duos
Musical groups from London
AM PM Records artists
Atlantic Records artists
FFRR Records artists
Virgin Records artists